Cacyparis hylaria is a moth of the family Nolidae first described by Pieter Cramer in 1777. It was described from Suriname.

References

Moths described in 1777
Nolidae